Anagni Cathedral is a Catholic cathedral in Anagni, Lazio, Italy, notable as the summer residence of the Popes for centuries (before Castel Gandolfo). Home to the cathedra of the Diocese of Anagni-Alatri, it is a Marian church dedicated to the Annunciation of the Blessed Virgin Mary.

History
 
The cathedral is the episcopal seat of the Diocese of Anagni-Alatri.

The church was built in a Romanesque-style during 1072-1104 patronized by the Byzantine emperor Michele VII Ducas. The interior is in a Gothic-Lombard style after the refurbishment in 1250.

The interior pavement (1231) was set in cosmatesque mosaic. The interior lunette over the main portal depicts the Madonna and child between Saints Magno and Secondina (late 13th century). The ciborium on the main altar was completed by Vassalletto in 1267. The frescoes of the apostles on the apse walls were painted in the 17th century by Borgogna. While the frescoes in the half-dome apse with was completed in the 19th century by Giovanni and Pietro Gagliardi.

Crypt
A stairwell on the left side of the church descends to the crypt, also called the Oratory of Thomas Becket, canonized in the town of Segni three years after his murder in 1170. During the episcopate of Pandulf from 1237 until 1256, the walls were covered with frescoes depicting biblical scenes, many now severely damaged. Likely a number of artists worked in the crypt, including followers of Pietro Cavallini. Behind the altar, below a depiction of Christ and the Madonna is a depiction of St Thomas and other bishops. Other altars are dedicated to San Magno, patron of the town; also an altar dedicated to Saints Secondina, Aurelia, and Neomisia; an altar dedicated to Holy Martyrs; and finally an altar dedicated to Bishop Pietro da Salerno and the Holy Virgin Oliva. The mosaic pavement was completed by the Cosma family in 1231.

Views

References

External links

Anagni
Roman Catholic cathedrals in Italy
Cathedrals in Lazio
11th-century Roman Catholic church buildings in Italy
13th-century Roman Catholic church buildings in Italy
Romanesque architecture in Lazio
Churches in the province of Frosinone
Minor basilicas in Lazio